Jaco Van Dormael (born 9 February 1957) is a Belgian film director, screenwriter and playwright. His films especially focus on a respectful and sympathetic portrayal of people with mental and physical disabilities.

Van Dormael spent his childhood travelling around Europe, before going on to study filmmaking at the INSAS in Brussels, where he wrote and directed his first short film, Maedeli la brèche (1981), which received the Honorary Foreign Film Award at the Student Academy Awards. Van Dormael's feature debut, Toto le héros (1991), won the Caméra d'Or at the Cannes Film Festival.

Five years later, Le huitième jour (1996) played at Cannes, where his two leading actors, Daniel Auteuil and Pascal Duquenne, were jointly awarded the prize for Best Actor. His third feature film, Mr. Nobody (2009), won six Magritte Awards, including Best Film and Best Director.

Early life
Jaco Van Dormael was born in Ixelles. Belgium, on 9 February 1957 to a Belgian couple. Van Dormael was raised in Germany until age seven, when his family returned to Belgium. At his birth, he had nearly been strangled by the umbilical cord and received an insufficient supply of oxygen. It was feared that he might end up mentally impaired. This trauma may partly account for the recurring themes in his films, which explore the worlds of people with mental and physical disabilities.

He delighted in working with children and for a while pursued a career as a circus clown. He became a producer of children's entertainment with the Theatre de Galafronie, Theatre Isocele and Theatre de la Guimbarde. After developing an interest in filmmaking, he enrolled at the INSAS in Brussels and later the Louis Lumière College in Paris. As a children's entertainer, childhood and innocence would become strong themes throughout his work.

Career

Early work
In the 1980s, Van Dormael directed a number of short films. While he was a student at the INSAS, he wrote and directed the children's story Maedeli la brèche. The short film received the Honorary Foreign Film Award at the 1981 Student Academy Awards presented by the Academy of Motion Picture Arts and Sciences. The following year Van Dormael directed Stade 81, a documentary short film about the Paralympic Games. He later directed the short films Les voisins (1981), L'imitateur (1982), Sortie de secours (1983), and De boot (1985). His most famous short of the period is È pericoloso sporgersi (1984) which won the Grand Prix in international competition at the Clermont-Ferrand International Short Film Festival.

Mainstream breakthrough
Van Dormael made his feature-length debut in 1991 with Toto le héros (Toto the hero), a tale about a man who believes his life was "stolen" from him when he was switched at birth, told in a complex mosaic of flashbacks and dream sequences, sometimes with almost a stream of consciousness effect. Toto le héros was ten years in the making as Van Dormael rewrote the script at least eight times. In 1985, two Belgian producers read a version of the script, and over the next five years they raised about $3.5 million, a huge amount for a Belgian production, all in public money from Belgium, the European Community and state television in France and Germany. Van Dormael premiered Toto le héros at the 1991 Cannes Film Festival, where it won the Camera d'Or. The film was released to the public later that year. Reviewing the film, The New York Times called him "a bright new talent to celebrate". It won five Joseph Plateau Awards, the César Award for Best Foreign Film, four European Film Awards, the André Cavens Award, and received a BAFTA nomination. Pierre Van Dormael's composed the soundtrack for the film, and since their first collaboration in 1980, he has composed the music to all his brother's films. Toto le héros propelled Van Dormael into the international spotlight as both a writer and director.

In 1995, Van Dormael participated in the 1995 project Lumière et compagnie (Lumière and Company). This work is an anthology of very short works (on average 50–60 seconds) contributed by international film directors in which each used the original Auguste and Louis Lumière's motion picture camera to make his film. The Kiss is the 52-second film made by director Jaco Van Dormael featuring actor Pascal Duquenne. At the same time, Van Dormael was at work writing his next major work.

He wanted to make a more linear film than Toto le héros, one which explored the world through the eyes of a man with Down syndrome. Van Dormael's next film, Le huitieme jour (The Eighth Day), accomplishes this with the chance meeting and friendship between Georges, played by Pascal Duquenne, and Harry, an unhappy divorced businessman portrayed by Daniel Auteuil. Van Dormael's interest in people with mental and physical disabilities stems from an interest in their "talent for life, for loving life, that we often lack." He sought to explore the concept of two worlds (that of Georges and that of Harry) existing simultaneously and yet separately. Le huitième jour premiered at the 1996 Cannes Film Festival, where it was nominated for the Palme d'Or. It did win the Best Actor award at the festival, which was given to both Pascal Duquenne and Daniel Auteuil. This was the first time in the festival's history that two actors had shared the award. The film received four Joseph Plateau Awards and was nominated for a César Award and the Golden Globe Award for Best Foreign Language Film. Le huitième jour grossed $33 million worldwide on a budget of $5 million, making it Van Dormael's highest-grossing film to that point.

In 1998, Van Dormael participated in the project Spotlights on a Massacre: 10 Films Against 100 Million Antipersonnel Land Mines, a collection of short films that works as an anti-land mine campaign. The same year he was also a member of the jury at the 51st Cannes Film Festival. In 1999, Toto le héros received the Best Belgian Screenplay 1984–1999 Award at the 13th Joseph Plateau Awards.

Mr. Nobody and after

Van Dormael began seeking to film Mr. Nobody in 2001, an attempt that lasted six years before the director was able to make his English-language feature debut in 2007. This project differed from other Belgian productions in being filmed in English instead of in one of Belgium's main languages. The director explained, "The story came to me in English. It's a story set over very long distances and time frames. One of the strands of the plot is about a kid who must choose between living with his mother in Canada or his father in England. There are also some incredible English-speaking actors I wanted to work with." The production budget for Mr. Nobody was €37 million, ranking it the most expensive Belgian film as of 2008. The budget was approved before casting was done, based on the prominence of the director's name and the strength of his script. The film utilizes nonlinear narrative and the many-worlds interpretation to tell the life story of the last mortal on Earth, Nemo Nobody, portrayed by Jared Leto.

Mr. Nobody had its world premiere at the 66th Venice International Film Festival on 12 September 2009, where it won the Biografilm Award and the Golden Osella for Outstanding Technical Contribution. It received 10 minutes of applause at its premiere at the 66th Venice International Film Festival and has a 64% approval rating on Rotten Tomatoes It received seven Magritte Award nominations, winning Best Film, Best Director, Best Screenplay, Best Cinematography, Best Original Score and Best Editing. It also won the André Cavens Award and the People's Choice Award for Best European Film at the 23rd European Film Awards. Empire called it "a bit of a mess" but "a cult movie in the truest sense of the word".

In August 2014, Van Dormael began filming his fourth feature film, Le Tout Nouveau Testament (The Brand New Testament), with Catherine Deneuve, Yolande Moreau and Benoît Poelvoorde, a comedy in which God (Poelvoorde) is alive and lives in Brussels with his daughter. It premiered at the 68th Cannes Film Festival on 17 May 2015 to critical acclaim.

Themes
Van Dormael's films, while few, have strong common themes between them. They make distinctive use of naive voiceover and examine the world from an innocent perspective (the young Thomas in Toto le héros, the protagonist with a developmental disability of Le huitième jour, and the unborn child of Mr. Nobody). These characters views are often colorful, imaginative, and somewhat removed from reality, with slight elements of surreal imagery used to illustrate their active imaginations.

His films also typically end with a death, which is portrayed not as a tragedy, but as a happy moving on where the deceased looks down happily at the world below. Between Heaven and Earth ends with a birth, but it is similarly handled the passing of a character into a new world. This pattern is continued in Mr. Nobody, where two deaths open the film and a unique twist on death at the end of the film conveys a wistful sense of happiness.

Van Dormael makes prominent use of nostalgic standards music, as well, featuring "Boum!" by Charles Trenet in Toto le héros and "Mexico" by Luis Mariano in Le huitième jour as recurring themes. Mr. Nobody used "Mr. Sandman" as its recurring musical theme.

All of Van Dormael's films contain surreal elements. In his first two films, these moments were few, like dancing flowers in Toto le héros or Georges flying around the room in Le huitième jour. Mr. Nobody makes much more extensive use of surreal imagery throughout the film.

Both Toto le héros and Le huitième jour prominently featured characters with Down syndrome, and portrayed these characters lovingly, emphasizing their characteristic strengths.

Filmography

Feature films

Short films
 Maedeli la brèche (1980)
 Stade 81 (1981)
 Les voisins (1981)
 L'imitateur (1982)
 Sortie de secours (1983)
 È pericoloso sporgersi (1984)
 De boot (1985)
 The Kiss (1995)
 Eole (2010)

References

External links

1957 births
20th-century Belgian dramatists and playwrights
21st-century Belgian dramatists and playwrights
Belgian male dramatists and playwrights
Belgian cinematographers
Belgian film directors
Belgian film producers
Belgian screenwriters
César Award winners
Directors of Caméra d'Or winners
English-language film directors
European Film Award for Best Screenwriter winners
French-language film directors
Magritte Award winners
Living people
People from Ixelles
People from Uccle